Overjoyed may refer to:

 Overjoyed (Heo Young-saeng album), an album by Heo Young-saeng, 2012
Overjoyed, album by William Galison
 Overjoyed (Half Japanese album), an album by Half Japanese, 2014
 "Overjoyed" (Bastille song), 2012
 "Overjoyed" (Jars of Clay song), 1998
 "Overjoyed" (Matchbox Twenty song), 2012
 "Overjoyed" (Stevie Wonder song), 1985